German submarine U-286 was a Type VIIC U-boat of Nazi Germany's Kriegsmarine during World War II.

The submarine was laid down on 3 August 1942 at the Bremer Vulkan yard at Bremen-Vegesack as yard number 51. She was launched on 21 April 1943 and commissioned on 5 June under the command of Oberleutnant zur See Willi Dietrich.

She was sunk by British warships on 29 April 1945 off Murmansk.

Design
German Type VIIC submarines were preceded by the shorter Type VIIB submarines. U-286 had a displacement of  when at the surface and  while submerged. She had two shafts and two  propellers.

U-286 was fitted with five  torpedo tubes (four fitted at the bow and one at the stern), fourteen torpedoes, one  SK C/35 naval gun, 220 rounds, and two twin  C/30 anti-aircraft guns. The boat had a complement of between forty-four and sixty.

Service history
U-286 served with the 8th U-boat Flotilla for training from June 1943 to July 1944 and operationally with the 11th flotilla from 1 August. She was then reassigned to the 13th flotilla on 5 November and back to the 11th flotilla on 1 March 1945. She carried out four patrols, sinking one warship of 1,150 tons.

The boat's first patrol was preceded by a short voyage from Kiel on 10 June 1944 to Flekkefjord in Norway (west of Kristiansand).

First, second and third patrols
U-285s first patrol proper began with her departure from Flekkefjord on 5 July 1944. On the 18th, she was attacked by a Norwegian De Havilland Mosquito of No. 333 Squadron RAF. One man was killed, seven others were wounded. The boat was also damaged, but docked at Kristiansand the same day.

Her second sortie was preceded by a series of short voyages between Kristiansand, Bergen and Horten Naval Base which culminated in Trondheim. This patrol took her three times to the Norwegian Sea and Murmansk, but success continued to elude her. She arrived in Harstad, (northwest of Narvik). on 7 January 1945.

The boat's third foray was relatively uneventful, starting and finishing in Harstad.

Fourth patrol and loss
The submarine sank the British frigate  in the Kola Inlet  from Murmansk on 29 April 1945.

Soviet and Russian sources state U-286 was sunk on 23 April 1945 by depth charges from Soviet destroyer "Karl Liebknecht" of Novik-class.

Wolfpacks
U-286 took part in three wolfpacks, namely:
 Stier (28 November 1944 – 3 January 1945) 
 Rasmus (6 – 13 February 1945) 
 Faust (16 – 29 April 1945)

Summary of raiding history

References

Notes

Citations

Bibliography

External links

German Type VIIC submarines
U-boats commissioned in 1943
U-boats sunk in 1945
World War II submarines of Germany
1943 ships
Ships built in Bremen (state)
Ships lost with all hands
U-boats sunk by British warships
World War II shipwrecks in the Arctic Ocean
U-boat accidents
Maritime incidents in April 1945